Jeong Jang (born 11 June 1980) is a South Korean professional golfer who played on the U.S.-based LPGA Tour. She was also a member of the LPGA of Korea Tour.

Jang was born in Daejeon, South Korea. She started playing golf at the age of thirteen. As a teenager she won the 1997 Korea Women's Open and the 1998 Korea Women's Amateur. She attended Joongbu University. After qualifying for the LPGA Tour at her first attempt, Jang had a successful rookie season in 2000 including a second-place finish. She reached twelfth on the money list in 2004 and in that year had nine finishes in the top ten. In July 2005 she won for the first time, claiming the Women's British Open, which is one of the women's majors, by four shots. She claimed her second LPGA win in 2006 at the Wegmans LPGA.

Professional wins (3)

LPGA Tour wins (2)

LPGA Tour playoff record (0–3)

LPGA of Japan Tour wins (1)

Tournament in bold denotes major championships in JLPGA Tour.

LPGA of Korea Tour wins (1)
1997 Korea Women's Open

Major championships

Wins (1)

Results timeline
Results not in chronological order before 2014.

^ The Women's British Open replaced the du Maurier Classic as an LPGA major in 2001
^^ The Evian Championship was added as a major in 2013

CUT = missed the half-way cut
WD = withdrew
T = tied

Summary

Most consecutive cuts made – 23 (2002 Kraft Nabisco – 2007 U.S. Open)
Longest streak of top-10s – 1 (five times)

Team appearances
Amateur
Espirito Santo Trophy (representing South Korea): 1998

Professional
Lexus Cup (representing Asia team): 2005, 2007 (winners), 2008
World Cup (representing South Korea): 2005

References

External links

KLPGA profile 
Seoul Sisters – fansite profile

South Korean female golfers
LPGA Tour golfers
LPGA of Korea Tour golfers
Winners of LPGA major golf championships
Asian Games medalists in golf
Asian Games silver medalists for South Korea
Asian Games bronze medalists for South Korea
Golfers at the 1998 Asian Games
Medalists at the 1998 Asian Games
Sportspeople from Daejeon
1980 births
Living people